First Mini Album may refer to:

 1st Mini Album (Jung Joon-young EP)
 1st Mini Album (Taegoon EP)
 1st Mini Album (2NE1 EP)
 The First Mini Album (Orange Caramel EP)
 The 1st Mini Album (Strawberry Milk EP)